Cecil Lee Mulleneaux (April 1, 1908 – November 14, 1985) was a player in the National Football League. He played his first season with the New York Giants. During the 1933 NFL season he played with the Cincinnati Reds before splitting the following season between the Reds and the St. Louis Gunners. For the next two seasons he played for the Pittsburgh Pirates. After a season away from the NFL, he split the 1938 NFL season between the Chicago Cardinals and the Green Bay Packers.

References
 Profile at pro-football-reference.com

1908 births
1985 deaths
New York Giants players
Cincinnati Reds (NFL) players
St. Louis Gunners players
Pittsburgh Pirates (football) players
Chicago Cardinals players
Green Bay Packers players
Northern Arizona Lumberjacks football players
Players of American football from Phoenix, Arizona